Trioceros nyirit, the Mount Mtelo stump-nosed chameleon or Pokot chameleon, is a species of chameleon endemic to Kenya.

References

Trioceros
Reptiles described in 2011
Reptiles of Kenya